Gabaza is a genus of flies in the family Stratiomyidae.

Species
Gabaza albiseta (Meijere, 1907)
Gabaza argentea Walker, 1858
Gabaza brunettii (Krivosheina, 2002)
Gabaza connectens (James, 1950)
Gabaza darwini (Hill, 1919)
Gabaza detracta (Walker, 1856)
Gabaza dorsalis (James, 1950)
Gabaza edashigei (Nagatomi, 1975)
Gabaza meijerei (Krivosheina, 1983)
Gabaza nigrotibialis (Pleske, 1930)
Gabaza paupera (Walker, 1864)
Gabaza sinica (Lindner, 1940)
Gabaza tibialis (Kertész, 1909)
Gabaza tsudai (Ôuchi, 1938)

References

Stratiomyidae
Brachycera genera
Taxa named by Francis Walker (entomologist)
Diptera of Asia